Kingston upon Hull West and Hessle is a borough constituency for the House of Commons of the Parliament of the United Kingdom. It elects one Member of Parliament (MP) at least once every five years by the first-past-the-post electoral system. The constituency has been represented by Emma Hardy of the Labour Party since the 2017 general election.

History
The constituency was created in 1997, mostly from the former seat of Kingston upon Hull West as Hessle joined from the former seat of Beverley.

Boundaries

This seat contains the wards of Boothferry, Derringham, Myton, Newington, Pickering, and St Andrew's in the City of Kingston upon Hull and Hessle in the District of East Riding of Yorkshire.

Constituency profile
Despite its name, the constituency takes in most of Kingston upon Hull's inner city, a deprived area that is currently undergoing regeneration. The area still has some way to go before it is fully restored to healthy economic life, and unemployment remains high; this has not been helped by the declining fishing industry. Hessle is a quiet suburb to the west, conservative by nature and having little in common with its larger neighbour apart from mostly working-class roots.

In 2005, The Guardian described the seat as a "City centre and fishing port of isolated, rather grim east coast town."

Members of Parliament

Elections

Elections in the 2010s
Due to a transcription error when declaring the results, the Green Party were initially said to have received 50 votes. However, it later became clear that city council officials had ‘lost’ 510 Green Party votes. They polled 560 votes.

Elections in the 2000s

Elections in the 1990s

See also
List of parliamentary constituencies in Humberside

References

Politics of Kingston upon Hull
Politics of the East Riding of Yorkshire
Parliamentary constituencies in Yorkshire and the Humber
Constituencies of the Parliament of the United Kingdom established in 1997